Bhinmal (previously Shrimal Nagar) is an ancient town in the Jalore District of Rajasthan, India. Bhinmal was the capital of the Rao king, then the capital of Gurjaradesa, comprising modern-day southern Rajasthan and northern Gujarat.

The town was the birthplace of the Sanskrit poet Magha and mathematician-astronomer Brahmagupta.

History 
The original name of Bhinmal was Bhillamala. Its older name was Srimal, from which Shrimali Brahmins took their name  Xuanzang, the Chinese Buddhist pilgrim who visited India between 631 and 645 AD during Harsha's reign, mentioned this place as Pi-lo-mo-lo. There are different views about the origin of its name. It is suggested that it may from its Bhil population, whereas Shrimalamahatmaya said the name arose because of the poverty caused by Islamic invaders, which caused most of its people to migrate from the area. It was the early capital of the kingdom of Gurjaradesa. The kingdom is first mentioned in Banabhatta's Harshacharita in the seventh century AD. Its king is said to have been defeated by Harsha's father Prabhakaravardhana, who died  605 AD. The surrounding kingdoms were Sindha (Sindh), Lāta (southern Gujarat) and Malava (western Malwa), indicating that the region included northern Gujarat and southern Rajasthan.

Xuanzang mentioned the Gurjara country (Kiu-che-lo) with its capital at Bhillamala (Pi-lo-mo-lo) as the second largest kingdom of Western India. He distinguished it from the neighbouring kingdoms of Bharukaccha, Ujjayini, Malava, Valabhi and Surashtra. The Gurjara kingdom was said to have measured 833 miles in circuit and its ruler was a 20-year old Kshatriya, distinguished for his wisdom and courage. It is believed that the king must have been the immediate successor of the Chavda dynasty ruler Vyāgrahamukha, under whose reign the mathematician-astronomer Brahmagupta wrote his treatise in 628 AD.

The chroniclers of Sindh (an Arab province from 712 AD onward) narrated the campaigns of Arab governors on Jurz, the Arabic term for Gurjara. They mentioned it jointly with Mermad (Marumāda, in Western Rajasthan) and Al Baylaman (Bhinmal). The country was first conquered by Mohammad bin Qasim (712-715) and, for a second time, by Junayd (723-726). Upon bin Qasim's victory, Al-Baladhuri mentioned that the Indian rulers, including that of Bhinmal, accepted Islam and paid tribute. They presumably recanted after bin Qasim's departure, which made Junayd's attack necessary. After Junayd's reconquest, the kingdom at Bhinmal appeared to have been annexed by the Arabs.

A new dynasty was founded by Nagabhata I at Jalore, near Bhinmal, in about 730 AD, soon after Junayd's end of term in Sindh. Nagabhata is said to have defeated the "invincible Gurjaras",  presumably those of Bhinmal. Another account credits him for having defeated a "Muslim ruler". Nagabhata is also known to have repelled the Arabs during a later raid.

The Gwalior Inscription of Mihira Bhoja praises Nagabhata for destroying mlecchas (Arabs):

"स्तस्यानुजोसौ मघवमदमुषो मेघनादस्य संख्ये सौमित्त्रिस्तीव्रदण्डः प्रतिहरणविधेयः प्रतीहार आमोत् 
तहन्शे प्रतिहारकेतनभृति त्रैलोक्यरक्षास्पदे देवो
नागभट : पुरातनमुनर्मूतिर्बभूवाद्भुतं । 
येनासौ सुक्कतप्रमाथिबलनम्लेच्छा।।

His dynasty expanded to Ujjain, and Nagabhata's successor Vatsaraja lost Ujjain to the Rashtrakuta prince Dhruva, who claimed to have driven him into "trackless desert". An inscription in Daulatpura from 843 AD mentions Vatsaraja having made grants near Didwana. Later, the Pratiharas became the dominant force of the Rajasthan and Gujarat regions, and established an empire centered at Kannauj, the former capital of Harshavardhana. Raja Man Pratihar ruled Bhinmal in Jalore when Parmara Emperor Vakpati Munja(972-990 CE) invaded the region – after this conquest he divided these conquered territories among his Parmara princes. His son Aranyaraj Parmar was granted the Abu region, and his son Chandan Parmar and nephew Dharnivarah Parmar were given the Jalore region. Raja Man Pratihar's son Dewalsimha Pratihar was a contemporary of Abu's Raja Mahipal Parmar (1000–1014 CE). Raja Devalsimha made unsuccessful attempts to free his country or re-establish Pratihar hold on Bhinmal. He finally settled for the territories to the southwest of Bhinmal, comprising four hills: Dodasa, Nadwana,Kala-Pahad and Sundha. He made Lohiyana (present-day Jaswantpura) his capital. Gradually their jagir included 52 villages in and around modern Jalore district. The Dewals participated in Jalore's Chauhan Kanhaddeo's resistance against Allauddin Khilji. Thakur Dhawalsimha Dewal of Lohiyana supplied manpower to Maharana Pratap and married his daughter to the Maharana, in return Maharana gave him the title of "Rana" which has stayed with them to now.

Shrimala 
Bhinmal was also called Shrimala, which was recorded in the Shramali Purana. The Brahmins and merchants of Bhinmal were called Shrimali Brahmanas and Shrimali Vaniyas respectively. After Vanaraja Chavda established a new capital at Patan, the symbolic centre of these communities shifted to Patan. The main image of Mahalakshmi was moved from Bhinmal to Patan in 1147.

Geography 

Infrastructure

Education 
On 23 August 2013 Bhinmal College was upgraded to post-graduate status by the Department of College Education.

Administrative set-up 
 Bhinmal has a septate District Transport Office (DTO) including Vehicle Registration Code RJ-46 allotted by Transport Department of Govt of Rajasthan on 19 July 2013.
 Bhinmal constituency elects one member to the Vidhan Sabha (Rajasthan State Assembly)

Demography 
According to the 2011 Census of India, Bhinmal had a population of 302,553, subdivided into a rural population of 254,621 and an urban population was 47,932, Males constituted 50.6% of the population and females 49.4%. Bhinmal had an average literacy rate of 53.6%, lower than the national average of 74%, with male literacy of 70.2% and female literacy of 36.8%. 17% of the population were under six years of age.

Monuments 
 Dadeli Baori
 Mahalakshmi Kamaleshvari Temple - Dhora Dhal - Bhinmal

Bhinmal in the news 
During construction work at the premises of Shri Parshwa Nath temple at Bhinmal town in the Jalore district of Rajasthan, a 450-year-old temple structure was unearthed in 2002. The temple possesses five images of Jain Tirthankars made of white marble.

A documentary made on Bhinmal, My Beautiful Village Bhinmal, by Azad Jain, won "Best Documentary-Writing" Award in Rolling Frames Short Film Summit, Bangalore, in 2014. It was also screened at the Ekotop Junior Film Festival; Slovak Republic, Europe; Pink City Short Film Festival, Jaipur; and Wanderlust Film Festival, Jaisalmer. Newspapers from Rajasthan mentioned it as it was the only film in the festival about a Rajasthani village and its people.

See also
Kshemkari Mata Temple
Bhandavapur

References

Bibliography

Campbell, James MacNabb; Reginald Edward Enthoven (1901). Gazetteer of the Bombay Presidency. Govt. Central Press, 2. .

Malabari, Behramji Merwanji; Krishnalal M. Jhaveri (1998). Gujarat and the Gujaratis: Pictures of Men and Manners Taken from Life. Asian Educational Services, .

External links
अब जल्द ही सेना का टी-55 टैंक महावीर सर्किल पर दिखेगा
महाकवि माघ का पैनोरमा हॉल तैयार, अब गणित पर भीनमाल में कर सकेंगे शोध, मिलेगी अलग पहचान

Cities and towns in Jalore district
Former capital cities in India